Antoine McKay (born August 10, 1970) is an American actor, director and educator who appears as “Bunkie” in the hit TV primetime drama Empire and "Uncle Spike" in South Side.

Early life 
McKay was born in Inkster, Michigan to Ivory and Jelena McKay. McKay, who was the second of four children, attended St. Aloysius Elementary and graduated from Wayne Memorial High School. McKay later attended Eastern Michigan University, where he studied theater.

Career 
McKay developed an interest in performing early in life, but it wasn’t until he saw his older brother perform in a high school version of Oklahoma that he was finally inspired to pursue acting. McKay attended Eastern Michigan University in Ypsilanti, MI, where he studied theatre. McKay performed on Second City’s Main Stages in Detroit and later relocated to Chicago where he performed alongside actors like Keegan-Michael Key, Nyima Funk, Josh Funk and Marc Evan. McKay has also been a frequent performer and contributor to Chicago's Under the Gun Theater, performing alongside Mishu Hilmy.

Personal life 
McKay is a long-time resident of Chicago.
He is a father of six children (Noah McKay, Bailey McKay, Zachary McKay, Sadie McKay, Hannah McKay, and Elijah McKay) .

Filmography 
 South Side (TV series) (2019, 2021-2022)
 Rogers Park (Movie) (2018)
 Keeping Up with the Joneses (Movie) (2016)
 He Sends Rain (Movie) (filming) (2015)
 Sense8 (TV Series) (2015)
 24/7 (Movie) (2015)
 The Don't We Boys: Sketch Corp. (TV Movie) (filming) (2015)
 Resurrecting McGinn(s) (2015)
 Empire (2015 TV series) (2015)
 The Drunk (2014)
 Review (TV series) (2014)
 Mind Games (TV series) (2014)
 Cauliflower Man (2014)
 Boss (TV Series) (2012)
 Detroit 1-8-7 (TV Series) (2010)
 Osso Bucco (2008)
 Sports Action Team (TV Series) (2006, 2007)
 Prison Break (TV Series) (2005, 2006)
 I Want Someone to Eat Cheese With (2006)
 The Weather Man—Passing Pedestrian (2005)
 Secrets of Fenville (2003)
 Standing in the Shadows of Motown (Documentary) (2002)

References 

1970 births
Male actors from Michigan
Eastern Michigan University alumni
Living people
Male actors from Chicago
People from Inkster, Michigan